Dinu Negreanu (18 November 1917 - 14 November 2001) was a Romanian film director.

Filmography
 Life Triumphs (1951)
 The Bugler's Grandsons (1953)
 The Sun Rises (1954) 
 Alarm in the Mountains (1955)
 Stormy Bird (1957)

References

External links

1917 births
2001 deaths
People from Tecuci
Romanian expatriates in the United States
Romanian film directors
Romanian screenwriters
20th-century screenwriters